Space Launch Complex 41 (SLC-41), previously Launch Complex 41 (LC-41), is an active launch site at Cape Canaveral Space Force Station. As of 2020, the site is used by United Launch Alliance (ULA) for Atlas V launches. Previously, it had been used by the USAF for Titan III and Titan IV launches.

Atlas V
After the last Titan launch, the complex was renovated to support the Atlas V. SLC-41 was the site of the first-ever Atlas V launch on 21 August 2002, lifting Hot Bird 6, a Eutelsat geostationary communications spacecraft built around a Spacebus 3000B3 bus.

Atlas V rockets are assembled vertically on a mobile launcher platform in the Vertical Integration Facility, located to the south of the pad. The MLP is transported to the launch pad on rails about a day before launch.

Modifications for supporting human spaceflight 

In September 2015, pad modifications began to support human spaceflight with the Boeing CST-100 Starliner. Modifications include the addition of a launch service tower to provide access to the capsule for "pre-launch processing, crew access, and safety egress systems should the need to evacuate Starliner on the pad occur".

History

Notable payloads
In addition to satellites, Titan vehicles launched several probes from LC-41 in the 1970s, including the Helios probes to study the Sun, the Viking probes to Mars, and the Voyager planetary flyby and deep-space probes. More recent probes have also been launched from LC-41 using the Atlas V: the Mars Reconnaissance Orbiter in August 2005, the New Horizons spacecraft to Pluto in January 2006, the Juno mission to Jupiter in August 2011, and the Mars rover missions; Mars Science Laboratory in November 2011, and Mars 2020 in July 2020.

Titan III
The Titan III launch facilities at CCAFS were built as part of an Integrate-Transfer-Launch approach intended to enable a rapid launch rate. Titan vehicles were assembled and integrated with their payloads on mobile platforms in separate buildings, then moved by rail to one of two launch pads. The Titan III facilities included LC-40, LC-41, assembly buildings including the Vertical Integration Building, and the first rail line at the Cape. The facilities were completed in 1964, and the first launch from LC-41 was of a Titan IIIC carrying four separate payloads on 21 December 1965.

The Titan III facility at Complex 41 was deactivated in late 1977.

Titan IV
In 1986 the existing mobile service tower (MST) and umbilical tower (UT) were both stripped down to their main structural components which were then refurbished, modified, and added to, as part of Martin Marietta's "tear-out and refurbish" contracts which modified and prepared the launch pad for the Titan IV rocket.
LC-41 launched the first flight of the Titan IV. The last Titan launch from LC-41 was on 9 April 1999, when a Titan IVB launched the USA 142 early warning satellite. The IUS upper stage failed to separate, leaving the payload stranded in a useless GTO orbit.

Launch history

Rocket configuration

See also
List of Cape Canaveral and Merritt Island launch sites
Cape Canaveral Space Launch Complex 40

References

External links
Cape Canaveral Space Force Station

Cape Canaveral Space Force Station
Launch complexes of the United States Space Force
1965 establishments in Florida